Ořechov is a municipality and village in Žďár nad Sázavou District in the Vysočina Region of the Czech Republic. It has about 300 inhabitants.

Administrative parts
The village of Ronov is an administrative part of Ořechov.

References

Villages in Žďár nad Sázavou District